Nasikabhushani (pronounced ) is a rāgam in Carnatic music (musical scale of South Indian classical music). It is the 70th Melakarta rāgam in the 72 melakarta rāgam system of Carnatic music. It is called  in Muthuswami Dikshitar school of Carnatic music.

Structure and Lakshana

Nasikabhushani is the 4th rāgam in the 12th chakra Aditya. The mnemonic name is Aditya-Bhu. The mnemonic phrase is sa ru gu mi pa dhi ni. Nasikabhushani's  structure (ascending and descending scale) is as follows:
: 
: 

The notes used in this scale are shatsruthi rishabham, antara gandharam, prati madhyamam, chathusruthi dhaivatham, kaisiki nishadham. See swaras in Carnatic music for details on above notation and terms.

Nasikabhushani is a melakarta rāgam and hence by definition it is a sampoorna rāgam (that is, it has all seven notes in ascending and descending scale). It is the prati madhyamam equivalent of Vagadheeswari, which is the 34th melakarta rāgam.

Janya rāgams 
Nasikabhushani has a couple of minor janya rāgams (derived scales) associated with it. See List of Janya rāgams for full list of rāgams associated with it and other melakarta.

Compositions
A few compositions set to Nasikabhushani rāgam are:

Maravairi ramani by Thyagaraja
Thandarul ayya by Koteeswara Iyer
Srirama Saraswathi by Muthuswami Dikshitar
Adigalige Vandipe by Vijaya Dasa
Ambikām Upāseham by Dr. M. Balamuralikrishna

Film Songs

Language:Tamil

Related rāgams
This section covers the theoretical and scientific aspect of this rāgam.

Nasikabhushani's notes when shifted using Graha bhedam from the dhaivatham (D2), yields another minor melakarta rāgam Shadvidamargini. Graha bhedam is the step taken in keeping the relative note frequencies same, while shifting the shadjam to the next note in the rāgam.

Nasikabhushani corresponds to Hungarian major scale in Western music.

Notes

References

Melakarta ragas